The complete list of presidents of the Portuguese Republic consists of the 20 heads of state in the history of Portugal since the  5 October 1910 revolution that installed a republican regime. This list includes not only those persons who were sworn into office as President of Portugal but also those who de facto served as head of state since 1910. This is the case of Teófilo Braga who served as President of the Provisional Government after the republican coup d'état. Also Sidónio Pais, Mendes Cabeçadas, Gomes da Costa, as well as Canto e Castro and Óscar Carmona in their early months, were not sworn into office as presidents of the Republic, usually being prime ministers, but de facto accumulated this function, thus combining in practice head of state and head of government in one person. See the notes for more information.

Presidents
The numbering reflects the uninterrupted terms in office served by a single man. For example, Jorge Sampaio served two consecutive terms and is counted as the 19th president (not the 19th and 20th). Teófilo Braga served as the first and sole president of the Provisional Government, and therefore is not considered to be the first president, although he would serve again as head of state and be the second president after the resignation of Manuel de Arriaga. However, Bernardino Machado served two non-consecutive terms, and he is counted as both the third and the eighth presidents. Because of this, the list below contains 20 presidencies, but only 19 presidents.

Under the Constitution of Portugal adopted in 1976, in the wake of the 1974 Carnation Revolution, the president is elected to a five-year term; there is no limit to the number of terms a president may serve, but a president who serves two consecutive terms may not serve again in the next five years after the second term finishes.

The official residence of the president of Portugal is the Belém Palace.

The current President of the Portuguese Republic is Marcelo Rebelo de Sousa, the winner of the 2016 presidential election and re-elected in the 2021 presidential election.

The colors indicate the political affiliation of each president.

/Independent

First Republic (1910–1926)

Second Republic (1926–1974)

Third Republic (1974–present) 

 Left office early:
  Assassinated.
  Died in office of natural causes.
  Resigned.
  Forced to resign due to a coup d'état.

Timeline

Birthplaces

Presidents by time in office

See also

President of Portugal
First Lady of Portugal
List of heads of state of Portugal
List of prime ministers of Portugal
List of Portuguese monarchs
Prime Minister of Portugal
Politics of Portugal
History of Portugal
History of Portugal (1910–1926)
History of Portugal (1926–1932)
History of Portugal (1932–1974)
History of Portugal (1974–1986)
History of Portugal (1986–2000)
History of Portugal (2000–present)
Timeline of Portuguese history

Notes

References

Portugal
Portuguese presidents by time in office
 
Presidents
Presidents
Presidents
Articles which contain graphical timelines